Metrorail Western Cape is a network of commuter and suburban rail services in the City of Cape Town Metropolitan Municipality (metropolitan area of Cape Town) and in the surrounding towns of Malmesbury, Paarl, Stellenbosch and Wellington in the Western Cape province of South Africa.

It is operated by Metrorail, which operates commuter rail services in the major cities of South Africa. The network is fairly comprehensive, however, some key areas have no service, notably the Atlantic Seaboard, Western Seaboard and Durbanville.

There are 85 operational trainsets, made up of 1094 coaches. In 2018 there were around 500,000 daily users of the service. The services are divided into three areas, each of which has various branches.

All services either commence or terminate at the main Cape Town station in the centre of the city, which has 24 platforms. All services are by electric multiple units, aside from the daily train to Malmesbury which is on a non-electrified line.

Routes

Southern Line 

The Southern Line travels from central Cape town through the Southern Suburbs to Muizenberg, and then along the edge of False Bay to Simon's Town. Although Simon's Town is the southern terminus, many trains terminate at Fish Hoek because the line south is single-track.

Cape Flats Line 

The Cape Flats Line travels east from Cape Town as far as Maitland, then turns south through Athlone, rejoining the Southern Line at Heathfield. The service terminates at the Retreat.

Central Line 

The Central Line serves areas to the southeast of the city centre. Trains run from Cape Town to Langa on two different routes, one around the southern side and the other around the eastern side of Pinelands. From Langa they travel on one of three lines, going either to Mitchell's Plain, to Khayelitsha, or through Belhar to Bellville.

Northern Line 

The Northern Line serves the northern suburbs of Cape Town as well as some outlying towns. Some trains travel from Cape Town station to Bellville along the old main line through Salt River, Maitland, Goodwood and Parow, while others travel along the relief main line via Century City. After Bellville, trains run on one of three routes: through Kraaifontein and Paarl to Wellington; via Kuils River and Stellenbosch to Muldersvlei; or Kuils River and Somerset West to Strand.

Two "Business Express" trains provide a luxury commuter service, travelling from the suburbs to Cape Town in the morning and the reverse in the afternoon. One train runs from Huguenot (Paarl) via Kraaifontein and Brackenfell to Cape Town, while the other runs from Strand via Somerset West and Kuils River to Cape Town.

There are also two longer-distance trains stopping at all stations en route daily. One along the main line to Worcester and at  the longest possible route on a commuter train in South Africa. The other is the only diesel-hauled commuter train in the Western Cape to Malmesbury which travels  on the route to Bitterfontein.

Operation 

Frequencies can vary vastly from weekday peaks to weekend-off peaks. Services to Simon's Town, Bellville via Century City, Strand, Muldersvlei (via Stellenbosch) and Wellington are less frequent over weekends with a train about every hour on Saturdays and every two hours on a Sunday. In contrast, weekday frequencies on some lines offer three-minute headways.

First-class MetroPlus coaches are always on the side closest to Cape Town.

Every train displays a four-digit train number. The route and destination of a specific train can be determined by just looking at the train number.
Up trains travel towards Cape Town and carry even train numbers, down trains travel away from Cape Town and carry odd train numbers. Destinations can be derived from the following table:

Infrastructure and rolling stock

Incidents 

 13 November 2006 - A train hit a truck stalled on an unprotected level crossing. The truck was carrying at least 33 farmworkers; nineteen were killed and six were injured.
 25 August 2010 - A train hit a minibus taxi that had allegedly driven around the boom barriers on a level crossing. The minibus was carrying fourteen schoolchildren, of whom ten were killed.
 20 October 2015 - Western Cape Metrorail reported this morning that four motor coaches and six carriages were destroyed in a fire in the early hours of Tuesday.
 15 April 2016 - Trains set alight at Woodstock and Kraaifontein.
 July 2016 - Robbery and murder of train driver at Netreg Station.
 7 August 2016 - Two Metrorail trains caught alight and burned at the Retreat Station in Cape Town on Sunday afternoon.
 1 December 2016 - Metrorail has had yet another one of its trains damaged. This time one was set alight at Thornton Station late on Thursday evening. 
 12 June 2017 - Two trains were gutted by fire at Cape Town station.
 20 November 2017 - Train set alight Century City
 27 April 2018 - A train hit a bakkie, killing all 7 people on board. This incident happened in the same place where the 2010 minibus incident occurred, i.e. Blackheath level crossing.
 22 May 2018 - 4 carriages were burnt
 30 May 2018 - 2 carriages were set alight - one person was killed and three injured.
 18 June 2018 - 3 train carriages were burnt on the Southern line. The fire began mid-afternoon at Steenberg Station.
 24 June 2018 - "At about 19:20 on the 24th June 2018 City Fire and Rescue Services responded in Radu Road in Philippi where three railway carriages were alight"
 21 July 2018 - Seven coaches, as well as two motor coaches and five trailers were destroyed by a fire. "The estimated cost of the damaged coaches is approximately R30m."
 26 July 2018 - Five carriages, and overhead power cables were damaged at Retreat Station.
 21 April 2019 - Two trains were set on fire at Cape Town station.

References

External links 
 
Steam tourism

Western Cape
Transport in Cape Town